Carlos Bernardo González Pecotche (August 11, 1901 – April 4, 1963), also known as Raumsol, was an Argentine humanist and thinker. He created and developed Logosophy in 1930.

Biography
González Pecotche was a son of Jorge N. González and Maria Pecotche de González. He married Paulina Eugenia Puntel on October 8, 1924 and had a son, Carlos Federico González Puntel, born on July 10, 1925.

He founded the first Logosophical Cultural Center on August 11, 1930, in the city of Córdoba, Argentina. Afterwards he implemented the creation of many other logosophical centers of study in Argentina, Uruguay and Brazil. He was the editor of two magazines (Aquarius, 1931–1939, and Logosofía, 1941–1947) and a newspaper (El Heraldo Raumsólico, 1935–1938), committed in teaching and divulging logosophical knowledge. He gave more than a thousand conferences and classes in Argentina, Uruguay and Brazil maintaining, during his life, extensive and comprehensive contact with scholars of Logosophy all over the world, as well as with intellectuals in South America and Europe. He wrote several books concerning Logosophy in several genres.

He also created the Logosophical Educational System, which today has 7 schools in Brazil, 2 in Argentina and 1 in Uruguay. These schools apply the logosophical pedagogy.

Bibliography
An Introduction to the Logosophical Cognition - 1951
Bases for Your Conduct (posthumous) - 1965
Deficiencies and Propensities of the Human Being - 1962
Dialogue - 1952 (Diálogos in Spanish; not yet available in English)
Initiation Course into Logosophy - 1963
Logosophical Exegesis - 1956
Logosophical Interlude - 1950 (Intermedio Logosófico in Spanish; not yet available in English)
Logosophy, Science and Method - 1957
Mr. De Sándara - 1959 (El Señor De Sándara in Spanish; not yet available in English)
Self-inheritance - 1957
The Spirit (posthumous) - 1968
The Mechanism of Conscious Life - 1956

Acknowledgments

The city of Buenos Aires (Argentina) has paid him an homage with a plate on the Portugal Plaza and with a Plaza that takes his name, near the National Library.

References

1901 births
1963 deaths
People from Buenos Aires
Argentine humanists
20th-century Argentine philosophers